Ranger Rick, originally Ranger Rick's Nature Magazine, is a children's nature magazine that is published by the United States National Wildlife Federation. The magazine offers feature articles and activities for children ages 7 and up in order to spark their interest in the outdoors and encourage them to become more actively involved in protecting the environment. The magazine's primary intention is to instill a passion for nature and promote activity outdoors. NWF also publishes two companion magazines, Ranger Rick Jr., which is aimed at ages 4–7, and Ranger Rick Cub, which is aimed at kids 0–4 years old.

History
In 1959, John Ashley "Ash" Brownridge (1917–2015), under the pseudonym John A. Morris, wrote the book "The Adventures of Rick Raccoon" starring an anthropomorphic raccoon named Rick and his friends at the Deep Green Wood. After seeing a book a colleague sent from Japan that featured a tanuki, he was inspired to create a book to teach children the value of conservation. Two years later, in 1960, he written another book entitled "Ranger Rick and the Great Forest Fire". Then, in January 1967, the first issue of Ranger Rick's Nature Magazine was published. The magazine was so popular that, by 1972, NWF's membership had tripled.

The first illustrator of the magazine was painter Lorin Thompson, who drew the characters in a realistic yet expressive manner. In 1982, he was replaced by Alton Langford, who redesigned the existing characters and introduced new characters Scarlett Fox and Boomer Badger. In 1999, Robby Gilbert took over as the new illustrator, coinciding with the magazine's shift from short stories to comic strips. In 2009, British company TheCharacterShop became the new illustrators, rendering the comics as three-dimensional images. In 2016, TheCharacterShop, under the direction of Parker Jacobs, gave the comics a new two-dimensional cartoony style.

Characters
Numerous characters have appeared in the magazine series. The current main three characters from the magazine's monthly comics are as follows:

Ranger Rick is a raccoon that serves as the park ranger and leader of Deep Green Wood. He was first portrayed extinguishing a forest fire in the first issue. He and his friends have many adventures together (as depicted in the magazine's regularly featured cartoon and fiction stories) and always look for new ways to help preserve the environment.
Scarlett Fox is an American red fox that wears a red bandana (formerly with her initials on it). Coming from the lower Appalachian Mountains in her debut in 1983, she was portrayed with a Southern accent; however, this was later dropped. Due to the stereotype of foxes being smart, she is shown to be cunning and quick-witted, which led her own advice column called "Ask Scarlett" in the 1990s and from 2018 onwards. As Ranger Rick's deputy, she can take command of a situation in an instant.
Boomer Badger is an American badger first appearing in 1984 who prefers to lay around and play games rather than take care of the environment, and he is shown in modern issues to love electronic devices.

Publication information
Ranger Rick has a circulation of 525,000, and an estimated 200,000 more children are exposed to the magazine via passed along copies. The magazine is published ten times a year by the National Wildlife Federation. The headquarters is in Reston, Virginia.

The magazine uses an environmentally friendly processed paper, which is composed of consumer waste (about 30%) and is absent of chlorine. Vegetable oils largely make up the magazine's actual ink.

Features
Each issue includes nonfiction articles about various environmental and animal topics, fictional story-like articles, and color photography throughout. Also included in the magazine are activities such as nature-themed games, activities that get children to actively learn more about their environment, riddles, and jokes. Most of the pages of the magazine feature multi-page photo stories of animals in their natural habitats. There are also illustrated stories, games, riddles, nature news, poetry, contests, and other features and columns. Ranger Rick, a raccoon park ranger, is the title character in the longstanding magazine feature Ranger Rick Adventures (originally Ranger Rick and his Friends, then Adventures of Ranger Rick): an illustrated short story depicting Ranger Rick and his compatriots from Deep Green Wood exploring the world, often encountering threats to wildlife and environmental problems.  Rick or any one of his friends, including Scarlett Fox, his deputy, and Boomer Badger always finds a solution to whatever problem they encounter, thus encouraging children to do their part to protect the natural environment.

Ranger Rick magazines have featured a variety of adventure stories tackling various subjects, such as the hazards of fishing lines at sea or invasive species in the Everglades. Ranger Rick is sometimes incorporated in elementary science classrooms to enhance the interest of environmental conservation in young children.

Recent modifications
Because technology has greatly influenced and impacted the lives of children today, Ranger Rick magazine has made modifications in order to appeal to the children who are becoming increasingly distant in engaging in outdoor exploration. In order to inspire a new generation of conservationists, attracting young readers is essential to magazines that promote environmental awareness and preservation efforts. Ranger Rick magazine has realized this importance of maintaining natural interest in young people. The magazine has since made changes within their content in order to appeal to a changed generation of children, not only for profit, but for the future of conservational efforts. The magazine has made such changes, for example, in the amount of narrative, by replacing the majority of narrative pieces with more visually engaging elements. Also, the Ranger Rick character himself has transformed from a somewhat realistic representation to a stylized cartoon figure. Some sections of the magazine have been modified as well, such as placing the text and titles in more modern and ideal locations to visually draw in readers.

Ranger Rick Jr.
Ranger Rick Jr. is a magazine for children ages 4 to 7. It has its origins in Your Big Backyard, a magazine aimed at preschoolers and kids ages 3 to 7. It was established in 1979 as a sister publication to Ranger Rick and Wild Animal Baby, both published by the National Wildlife Federation. The bulk of the magazine consisted of children's activities.

The name of the magazine was changed to Big Backyard in September, 2011. In December 2012 NWF merged Wild Baby Animal and Big Backyard to create a new magazine for children ages 4 to 7, called Ranger Rick, Jr..

Adaptations

Ranger Rick's debut on television started with an animated television commercial during the early 1970s. A stop-motion-live-action special was aired during the 1980s on PBS. There were plans to adapt the magazine stories into a feature length CGI animated film during 2011, but they never came to fruition. In 2021, Red Rock Films announced a partnership with the National Wildlife Federation and Bix Pix Entertainment to develop a new streaming series based on Ranger Rick's Adventures.

References

External links
National Wildlife Federation Ranger Rick

Children's magazines published in the United States
Fictional raccoons
Fictional foxes
Fictional badgers
Fictional park rangers
Monthly magazines published in the United States
Magazines established in 1967
Mascots introduced in 1967
Magazine mascots
Male characters in comics
Male characters in advertising
Magazines published in Virginia